Ōnishiki Ittetsu (born 11 September 1953 as Morio Obori) is a former sumo wrestler from Sado, Niigata, Japan. He made his professional debut in May 1968, and reached the top division in September 1973. His highest rank was komusubi. He retired in January 1988 and became an elder in the Japan Sumo Association under the name Yamashina, holding the Special Executive position.

Career
He joined sumo in May 1968 at the age of just 14, competing under his own surname of Obori. He was considered a very promising prospect and after winning his first jūryō division championship in May 1973 he was given the shikona or fighting name Ōnishiki, after a great wrestler from his Dewanoumi stable, the 26th yokozuna Ōnishiki Uichirō. Just two tournaments later he became the first wrestler in sumo history to win all three sanshō  or special prizes, for Fighting Spirit, Technique and Outstanding Performance, in his debut top division tournament. He was also runner–up in this basho and earned his first kinboshi  or gold star by defeating yokozuna Kotozakura. He was promoted straight to komusubi, which was to be his highest rank, but he suffered a serious back injury and scored only 3–12. He never made the rank again. As well his back problem he also suffered from knee problems and diabetes, and spent the rest of his career moving up and down the ranks of the two salaried divisions. He was to win seven more kinboshi, but he was also demoted to jūryō on a number of occasions, where he picked up three more jūryō championships. He only fell to the third makushita division once during this period though. In this tournament in May 1979 at makushita 1 he posted a perfect 7-0 record, took the championship, and also handed Itai his first defeat in professional sumo, ending a consecutive winning streak from debut which was a record at that time. In September 1982 he became the first wrestler to immediately follow a win by default (over Koboyama) with a loss by default. He retired in January 1988 rather than face demotion to the makushita division again.

Retirement
Onishiki remained in sumo as a toshiyori or elder, and was known as Yamashina Oyakata. He worked as a coach at Dewanoumi stable and as a member of the Japan Sumo Association′s board of directors, holding the Special Executive position. He retired from the Sumo Association in September 2018 after turning 65 years of age.

Fighting style
Onishiki was a yotsu sumo specialist who favoured hidari yotsu, or a right hand outside, left hand inside grip on his opponent′s mawashi. His favourite kimarite or techniques were yori kiri (force out) and uwatenage (overarm throw).

Career record

See also
Glossary of sumo terms
List of sumo tournament top division runners-up
List of sumo tournament second division champions
List of past sumo wrestlers
List of sumo elders
List of komusubi

References

1953 births
Living people
Japanese sumo wrestlers
Komusubi
Sumo people from Niigata Prefecture
People from Sado, Niigata